Norman Schuster (born December 13, 1979 in Halle an der Saale, Sachsen-Anhalt) is a boxer from Germany, who won the bronze medal in the Men's Lightweight (– 60 kg) division at the 2000 European Amateur Boxing Championships in Tampere, Finland.

Schuster represented his native country at the 2000 Summer Olympics in Sydney, Australia, being the youngest boxer in the German team with 20 years, 280 days. There he was stopped in the first round of the Men's Lightweight division by Venezuela's Patrick López.

References
 sports-reference

1979 births
Living people
Lightweight boxers
Boxers at the 2000 Summer Olympics
Olympic boxers of Germany
German male boxers